The Primetime Emmy Award for Outstanding Children's Program was presented to television programming aimed towards children in any format. Series, specials and non-fiction programming were all eligible for the award. Prior to 1974, both daytime and primetime programming was eligible. However, once the Daytime Emmy Awards were formed, only primetime television remained eligible.

The Academy of Television Arts & Sciences (ATAS) revised their rules for the 72nd Primetime Emmy Awards to exclude primetime specials or extensions of a daytime series from eligibility for the award. The rule change followed three consecutive wins for Sesame Street primetime specials. The category was retired beginning with the 73rd Primetime Emmy Awards, citing that streaming services had created further confusion over whether children's programs would be eligible for the award or not. The NATAS, who organizes the Daytime Emmys, announced in 2021 that it would introduce a Children's and Family Emmy Awards presentation beginning in 2022.

Winners and nominations

1950s

1960s

1970s

1980s

1990s

2000s

2010s

2020s

Programs with multiple awards

10 awards
 Sesame Street

9 awards
 Nick News with Linda Ellerbee

3 awards
 Time for Beany

2 awards
 Classical Baby
 Hallmark Hall of Fame
 Lassie
 The Teen Files

Programs with multiple nominations

22 nominations
 Nick News with Linda Ellerbee

17 nominations
 Sesame Street

7 nominations
 Kukla, Fran and Ollie

6 nominations
 Avonlea

5 nominations
 Captain Kangaroo
 iCarly
 Wizards of Waverly Place

4 nominations
 Degrassi
 Discovery
 Hannah Montana
 Rugrats
 3-2-1 Contact
 Time for Beany
 Walt Disney's Wonderful World of Color
 WonderWorks
 A YoungArts Masterclass

3 nominations
 Classical Baby
 Ding Dong School
 Dog with a Blog
 Good Luck Charlie
 Girl Meets World
 Hallmark Hall of Fame
 Jim Henson's The Storyteller
 Lassie
 The Shari Lewis Show
 Zoo Parade

2 nominations
 ABC Afterschool Special
 Big Top
 The Disney Sunday Movie
 The Electric Company
 High School Musical
 Howdy Doody
 Huckleberry Hound
 The Jim Henson Hour
 Lizzie McGuire
 Mister Rogers' Neighborhood
 NBC Children's Theatre
 Once Upon a Classic
 Punky Brewster
 Reading Rainbow
 School of Rock
 A Series of Unfortunate Events
 Star Wars Rebels
 Star Wars Resistance
 The Suite Life of Zack & Cody
 Super Circus
 The Teen Files
 That's So Raven
 Update
 Victorious
 Watch Mr. Wizard
 The Weight of the Nation for Kids
 The Wonderful World of Disney
 The Wubbulous World of Dr. Seuss
 Young People's Concerts

Notes

References

Children's Program
Children's television awards
Awards disestablished in 2020
Awards established in 1950